Baho Dheri is a Buddhist site in Swabi District of Khyber Pakhtunkhwa, Pakistan. According to archeologists, these artifacts are about 1800 years old and belongs from to the era of Gandhara Kingdom. As on date, more than 400 antiquities have been recovered. It is said to be the largest stupa in the area. Further excavations are underway.

References

Cultural heritage sites in Khyber Pakhtunkhwa
Pakistani culture
Ancient Central Asia
Archaeological sites in Khyber Pakhtunkhwa
Swabi District